Eremophila alternifolia, commonly known as narrow-leaved poverty bush, is a plant in the figwort family, Scrophulariaceae, and is endemic to areas between the far west of New South Wales, the far south of the Northern Territory and the southern half of Western Australia. It is a variable shrub, with respect to its growth form, leaf shape and flower colour. Aboriginal Australians used the leaves to treat ailments such as colds and skin infections and pharmacological testing has shown that the leaves contain compounds that affect cardiac activity.

Description
Eremophila alternifolia is a shrub with many branches and varying in height but mostly . The branches have many raised resin glands and raised leaf scars. The leaves vary in shape from almost cylinder-shaped to flattened and egg-shaped but have a small point on the end.

The flowers are purple, red, pink, white, cream, or yellow and appear on the plant from early winter to early autumn.

Taxonomy and naming
The species was first formally described in 1810 by Robert Brown and the description was published in Prodromus Florae Novae Hollandiae. The specific epithet (alternifolia) is a botanical term meaning "having leaves that alternate on each side of a stem".

Other common names for this species are round-leaved poverty bush, scented poverty bush, emubush, native honeysuckle, honeysuckle and narrow-leaved fuchsia bush.

In 1870, George Bentham described two subspecies in Flora Australiensis:
 E. alternifolia R.Br. var. alternifolia has more cylindrical or needle-shaped leaves, usually spotted petals and a wider distribution, mainly north of the Trans-Australian Railway and including the Northern Territory and New South Wales;
 E. alternifolia R.Br. var. latifolia F.Muell. ex Benth. has broader leaves, flowers without spots and is found mainly south of the Trans-Australian Railway in Western Australia and South Australia .

Distribution
Eremophila alternifolia occurs in arid areas of Western Australia, South Australia, Northern Territory and the Barrier Range in New South Wales, in many different habitats with stony or red soil.

Conservation status
In Western Australia this poverty bush is widespread and is classified as "not threatened" by the Government of Western Australia Department of Parks and Wildlife.

Uses

Medicine
Parts of this plant have been used as a traditional medicine. A small quantity was used in a preparation for treating colds and inflammation of the throat, an infusion of the leaves as a soporific, and other parts combined as a topical treatment. An indigenous name for the plant, Tarrtjan translated as "Goldfields", a region in the West where it is found. Compounds such as verbascoside present in the leaves of this species have been shown to have both antibacterial properties and the ability to dilate blood vessels.

Horticulture
This eremophila is an attractive shrub which is covered with masses of flowers in season. As with other members of the genus, it is sold as a drought resistant garden plant that is appealing to birds. It is a common garden plant, growing best in dry climates but has grown in more humid areas. Most forms are moderately frost tolerant but require well-drained soil and full sun. It is most easily propagated from cuttings.

Gallery

References

alternifolia
Flora of New South Wales
Flora of South Australia
Flora of the Northern Territory
Flora of Western Australia
Medicinal plants of Oceania
Plants described in 1810
[[Category:Taxa named by Robert Brown (botanist, born 1773)